Zhang Yinglun (born 1938) is a Chinese translator. He is famous for his research and translation of French literary works.

Biography
Zhang was born in Bengbu, Anhui, in 1938. In 1962 he graduated from Peking University, where he majored in French language and literature.
Then he studied and worked at the Chinese Academy of Social Sciences as a researcher. He has been living in France since 1988 and has served as a research fellow in charge of the French National Centre for Scientific Research. He joined the China Writers Association in 1983.

Works

Translations
 La Reine Margot
 Selection of Maupassant's Short Stories

References

1938 births
Living people
People from Bengbu
Writers from Anhui
Peking University alumni
French–Chinese translators